Gennaro Granito Pignatelli di Belmonte (10 April 1851 – 16 February 1948) was an Italian Cardinal of the Roman Catholic Church and a prominent member of the Roman Curia.

Biography
Gennaro Granito Pignatelli di Belmonte was born in Naples. He was ordained a priest on 7 June 1879 in Naples. He worked in the archdiocese in various roles, amongst which as secretary to Archbishop Guglielmo Sanfelice D'Acquavella. He was appointed a domestic prelate to the Pope on 4 April 1884 and joined the Roman Curia in 1892, where he was attached to the Sacred Congregation for Extraordinary Ecclesiastical Affairs, concerned with foreign affairs of the Holy See. As attaché and counselor, he held posts in the Paris nunciature from 1893 to 1896.

In 1899 Granito Pignatelli di Belmonte was appointed Titular Archbishop of Edessa, consecrated by Mariano Rampolla, Cardinal Secretary of State, in Rome. Concurrently, he became nuncio to Belgium, later to Austria-Hungary (1904–1911).  In 1909 the nuncio stood as godparent, representing Pope Pius X, to Don Carlos de Austria y de Borbón, son of Archduke Don Leopold Salvator of Habsburg-Lorraine and Infanta Doña Blanca de Borbón y de Borbón.

Pius X created him Cardinal-Priest in the Consistory of 27 November 1911, giving him the title of Santa Maria degli Angeli.  He was appointed a papal legate to the Eucharistic Congress of Lourdes on 12 July 1914. On 6 December 1915 he was promoted to Cardinal Bishop of Albano. From 4 December 1916 to 16 March 1919 he held the post of Camerlengo of the College of Cardinals.  He was appointed a papal legate to the Eucharistic Congress of Palermo on 6 August 1924. On 15 February 1930 he was appointed vice-Dean of the College of Cardinals, becoming Dean on 9 July 1930, when he was appointed Cardinal Bishop of Ostia in 1930. On 14 July that year the new Dean was also appointed Prefect of the Congregation of Ceremonies by Pope Pius XI.

He held both of these last posts until his death on 16 February 1948 in Rome. At 96 years of age, he was the oldest living cardinal and the last surviving cardinal of Pope Pius X. He participated in the conclaves of 1914, 1922 and 1939.

The Cardinal was appointed Grand Prior of Rome of the Sovereign Military Order of Malta from December 1937.  In 1911 he was granted the Grand Cross of the Order of Saint Stephen of Hungary by Emperor Franz Joseph I of Austria.

On his death, the Cardinal was interred at Campo Verano, in Rome.

References

External links
Catholic Hierarchy 
Cardinals of the Holy Roman Church

1851 births
1948 deaths
19th-century Neapolitan people
Deans of the College of Cardinals
20th-century Italian cardinals
Cardinal-bishops of Albano
Cardinal-bishops of Ostia
20th-century Italian Roman Catholic titular archbishops
Apostolic Nuncios to Austria
Apostolic Nuncios to Belgium
Gennaro
Cardinals created by Pope Pius X
Grand Crosses of the Order of Saint Stephen of Hungary
Bishops of Edessa